The Gangabal Lake, also called Haramukh Ganga, is a lake situated at the foot of Mount Haramukh in Ganderbal district, north of Srinagar, in Indian-administered Kashmir. It is an alpine high altitude oligotrophic lake,  home to many species of fish, including the brown trout. This lake is considered sacred in Hinduism and is one of the homes of Shiva. Kashmiri Hindus perform annual pilgrimage called Harmukh-Gangabal Yatra.

The lake has a maximum length of two and a half kilometers and maximum width of one kilometre. It is fed by precipitation, glaciers and springs. The lake water outflows to a nearby Nundkol Lake and then via Wangath Nallah to Sind River.

History
Gangabal has been mentioned in Hindu texts like the Nilamata Purana as well as Rajatarangini. Authors like Walter Roper Lawrence and Francis Younghusband also mentioned Gangabal lake and its association with Hindu rites. In 1519 around 10,000 Kashmiri Brahmans died possibly due to landslides and early snowstorms near Mahlish Meadow during their pilgrimage to Gangabal as they had gone to immerse the ashes of Kashmiri Hindus who were killed by Mir Shams-ud-Din Araqi on the day of Ashura.

After the gap of 200 years, APMCC/HGGT took the initiative and restarted Harmukh-Gangabal Yatra in 2009.

Religious significance
Gangabal Lake is sacred for Hindus. Each year Kashmiri Hindus take pilgrimage to the lake on the Ganga Ashtami. In the past Kashmiri Hindus used to immense the ashes of their dead ones in this lake.

Access
Gangbal Lake is approached from Srinagar 45 kilometers by road via Ganderbal up to Naranag and then a trek of 15 kilometers upslope leads to the lake, which can be covered by a horse ride or by foot. The gujjar shepherds can be seen during the trek with their flocks of sheep and goats. Another trek (25 kilometers long) leads to the lake site from Sonamarg via the Vishansar Lake crossing three mountain passes Nichnai pass, Gadsar pass and Zajibal pass of an average elevation of 4100 meters. It can also be accessed through a trek from Bandipore via Arin. The trek to the lake Gangabal takes place in an alpine environment, (cut crossing) with meadows, (cut from) and huts of Gujjars with their herds crossing through two passes over 4,000 m to get to the lake Gangabal.

Gallery

References

Lakes of Jammu and Kashmir
Geography of Ganderbal district
Tourist attractions in Ganderbal district